Teshima is a Japanese surname that may refer to
Alice Sae Teshima Noda (1894–1964), American businesswoman, dental hygienist and beauty industry entrepreneur 
Aoi Teshima (born 1987), Japanese singer and voice actress 
Ikurō Teshima (1910–1973), Japanese religious leader 
Kazuki Teshima (born 1979), Japanese football player 
Keiko Teshima (born 1980), Japanese judoka
Nami Teshima (born 1974), female Japanese judoka
Shiro Teshima (1907–1982), Japanese football player
Takeshi Teshima (born 1941), Japanese fencer
Taichi Teshima (born 1968), Japanese golfer 
Toshimitsu Teshima (born 1942), Japanese cyclist 
Yusuke Teshima, Japanese motorcycle racer

Japanese-language surnames